This list of museums in South Carolina, United States, encompasses museums defined for this context as institutions (including nonprofit organizations, government entities, and private businesses) that collect and care for objects of cultural, artistic, scientific, or historical interest and make their collections or related exhibits available for public viewing. Museums that exist only in cyberspace (i.e., virtual museums) are not included.

The list

Defunct museums 
 Communication Museum, Charleston, now a special collection of the College of Charleston, antique radios, televisions, phonographs, telephones, magic lanterns, motion picture projectors and other communications equipment
 Florence Air & Missile Museum
 Museum of Western York County, Sharon
 Ragtops & Roadsters Auto Museum, Murrells Inlet
 Rivers, Rails and Crossroads Regional Discovery Center, Blackville, exhibits moved to Arts and Heritage Center of North Augusta
 Slave Relic Historical Museum, Walterboro
 Thomas Elfe House, Charleston, private home

See also 
 List of nature centers in South Carolina

References

SCIway.net - South Carolina Museums
South Carolina Federation of Museums
South Carolina National Corridor

South Carolina
Museums
Museums